East Orland is an unincorporated village in the town of Orland, Hancock County, Maine, United States. East Orland has a post office with ZIP code 04431.

References

Villages in Hancock County, Maine
Villages in Maine